Under the Chinese Restaurant (also known as Trouble in Paradise) is a 1987 Italian fantasy-comedy film written and directed by Bruno Bozzetto. It is the first and only live action film by Bozzetto.

Cast 

Claudio Botosso: Ivan
Amanda Sandrelli: Eva
Claudia Lawrence: Bibi 
Bernard Blier: The Professor 
Nancy Brilli: Ursula
Giuseppe Cederna: Giovanni 
Cinzia Monreale: The Robber
 Haruhiko Yamanouchi: The Chinese Chef

References

External links

1987 films
1980s fantasy comedy films
Italian fantasy comedy films
Films directed by Bruno Bozzetto
1987 comedy films
1980s Italian films